Meyenheim is a commune in the Haut-Rhin department in Grand Est in north-eastern France. It lies on the Ill river, 12km east of Soultz-Haut-Rhin.

See also
 Communes of the Haut-Rhin département

References

Communes of Haut-Rhin